Don Michael "Red" Young is an American keyboard, piano, synthesizer and organ player.

Beginnings and early success 
He grew up in Fort Worth, Texas, United States.  He began playing piano at age 3 and did his first classical recital at age 8. He toured with Clyde McCoy (Sugar Blues) in 1967, Air Force Band 1968–72 and 1974 joined Lloyd Price (Stagger Lee, Personality) for a brief tour returning to Ft Worth where he joined Warren and Bill Ham, Darryl Norris and formed the Ham Brothers Band. The band did much recording at Huey Meaux's Sugar Hill Studio in Houston and he recorded with Freddy Fender, Noel Redding, Kinky Friedman, Joe Barry and many others during that period.

In 1976 he toured with Tompall Glaser, Willie Nelson, Waylon Jennings and Jessi Colter (Wanted! The Outlaws) the first platinum country album.

After the tour, he joined Sonny & Cher and moved to Los Angeles and subsequent tours and recordings with Joan Armatrading, Dolly Parton, Tanya Tucker, Eric Burdon and Linda Ronstadt with the Nelson Riddle Orchestra in addition to many TV, movie and live shows throughout the world.  He learned writing for orchestra along the way and studying Nelson Riddle and Victor Feldman among others.

In 1985–87 he returned to Ft Worth to form Red and the Red Hots,(originally named by Genny Schorr, Linda Ronstadt’s wardrobe stylist while on tour with Nelson Riddle),  a 10-piece swing band as lead vocalist, arranger and musical director performing more than 400 shows during the three-year period including a concert with the Ft Worth Symphony.  "The Redhots" included female vocalists Cassie Miller, Dina Bennet, Jennifer Griffith and Rebecca Kyler Downs.

In 1988–2002 he returned to Los Angeles for more recording, producing, TV and movie dates as a musician, tours with Juice Newton and four albums with Red & the Red Hots including more than a thousand shows with the band, in addition to albums with Big Bad Voodoo Daddy, Royal Crown Revue, Joey Altruda, Johnny Reno and many others.

In 2000 he returned to playing the Hammond B3 organ more and with his trio (Brother Red) and others in the jazz field – the Jazz Jury, Plas Johnson, Big Jay McNeely, Johnny Reno and many others. In addition he also did recording in the blues field – Janiva Magness, Kid Ramos, Marcia Ball and others and Dan Hicks. Did his own recordings in addition to a blues organ trio album (Brother Red) and a jazz album (The Organizer).

In 2002 he moved to Austin, Texas and concentrated on jazz organ and did albums also with Stephen Bruton, Marcia Ball and others. From 2004–2005 he was involved in a nightclub in Dallas called Django On The Parkway where he performed with many artists – George Clinton, Mike Morgan, Janiva Magness, Teresa James and others.

In 2006 he joined Eric Burdon again as keyboardist and Musical Director and still tours with Eric in addition to his own performances worldwide and with his wife Silvie Rider.

Solo career 
After forming Red and the Red Hots which had its beginnings as a part of Linda Ronstadt and Nelson Riddle Orchestra Tour in 1983–84, Red worked the band steadily for 20 years which produced four albums: Red & The Red Hots (1987), Red Hot Jazz (1996), Boogie Man (1998) and Gettin' Around (1999). In addition to recording they were featured in Everybody Loves Raymond and The Donny & Marie Show.

He released two Hammond organ albums Brother Red (2000) and The Organizer (2003)

He performs throughout the world in many different formats – both piano, organ, on vocals, conducting, producing and arranging. He also works many dates a month throughout Austin and the rest of Texas.

Eric Burdon 
After touring with Eric in 1982, Red went on to do other things. At Eric's 60th birthday bash in Los Angeles which included many people throughout the music industry and many special guests, Red, as part of the 1982 band played with Terry Wilson (bass), Tony Braunagel (drums) and Snuffy Walden (guitar). After that Red played on Eric's My Secret Life album (2004) produced by Tony Braunagel and was asked to join Eric in 2006 for a worldwide tour. He still tours with Eric in concert. The 2009 touring band consisted of Billy Watts (guitar), Terry Wilson (bass), Georgia Dagaki (Cretan lyra) and Brannen Temple (drums) and Red on Hammond organ and keyboards. Since 2013 the band consists of Billy Watts (guitar), Terry Wilson (bass), Wally Ingram (percussion), Tony Braunagel (drums) and Young on keyboards.

References

Living people
People from Fort Worth, Texas
1948 births
21st-century American keyboardists
Musicians from Austin, Texas
20th-century American keyboardists
American rock keyboardists
American session musicians